The 2001 Mississippi State Bulldogs football team represented Mississippi State University during the 2001 NCAA Division I-A football season. The team's head coach was Jackie Sherrill. The Bulldogs played their home games in 2001 at Davis Wade Stadium in Starkville, Mississippi.

Schedule

References

Mississippi State
Mississippi State Bulldogs football seasons
Mississippi State Bulldogs football